Athumani Miraji Madenge (born 29 October 1993) is a Tanzanian footballer who plays as a striker for Tanzanian club Simba and the Tanzania national team.

International career 
Madenge made his international debut for Tanzania on 14 October 2019, in a friendly against Rwanda. He participated at the 2020 African Nations Championship qualification against Sudan, helping his side qualify to the final tournament. Madenge played three games at the 2019 CECAFA Cup, with Tanzania finishing in fourth place.

Honours

Club
Simba
 Tanzanian Premier League: 2019–20
 FAT Cup: 2019–20
 Community Shield: 2019, 2020
 Mapinduzi Cup runner-up: 2019, 2020

References

External links 
 
 
 

1993 births
Living people
Tanzanian footballers
Association football forwards
Mwadui United F.C. players
Lipuli F.C. players
Simba S.C. players
Tanzania international footballers
Tanzanian Premier League players